Idiops opifex is a spider species found in French Guiana.

References

Idiopidae
Arthropods of South America
Fauna of French Guiana
Spiders described in 1889
Spiders of South America